Cassidulus delectus is a species of sea urchin of the family Cassidulidae. Their armour is covered with spines. Cassidulus delectus was first scientifically described in 1960 by Krau.

References 

Animals described in 1960
Cassidulidae